KH may refer to:

Places
 Cambodia (Kampuchea, Kambuja, Srok Khmer), a sovereign state with ISO 3166-2 alpha code KH
 .kh, the Internet country code top-level domain for Cambodia
 Kutná Hora District, Czech Republic (vehicle plate code)
 Kyustendil, Bulgaria (vehicle plate code)
 Bad Kreuznach, Germany (vehicle plate code)
 Borehamwood, Great Britain (vehicle plate code)
 Evrytania, Greece (vehicle plate code)

Science and technology
 KH (hardness), a measure of the hardness of water (calcium carbonate concentration)
 Kh factor, a constant used in electrical metering
 Henry's law, constant (KH, in thermodynamics
 Kelvin–Helmholtz instability, a phenomenon of fluid mechanics
 Key Hole (KH), series of imaging satellites used by various United States agencies
 Khornerstone, a computer benchmark used in periodicals such as UNIX Review
 Kurepa hypothesis, in mathematical set theory
 Potassium hydride, chemical formula KH
 Missiles etc. designated Kh-nn, Originally X-nn with Latin X for experimental, later interpreted as Cyrillic X transcribed as Kh (or sometimes H) see List of NATO reporting names for air-to-surface missiles.

Other uses
 Kata'ib Hezbollah, part of the armed forces of Iraq
 Kh (digraph), in English transliteration from numerous foreign languages, usually represents , but sometimes 
 Khouria, an Arabic title of honor for the wife of a priest
 Kingdom Hall
 Kingdom Hearts, a Disney and Square Enix video game series
 Kingdom Hearts (video game), the first game in the series
 A knight of the Royal Guelphic Order (KH)
 The King's Hospital, school in Ireland
 Kh (tramcar), the class of double axled high-floor tramcars